The Katainen Cabinet (—June 24, 2014) was the 72nd cabinet of Finland, formed as a result of the 2011 post-parliamentary election negotiations between the Finnish parliamentary parties. Led by Prime Minister Jyrki Katainen of the National Coalition Party (NCP), 12 ministers of the 19-minister government represented the NCP and the Social Democratic Party (SDP), while the Left Alliance, the Green League, the Swedish People's Party (RKP) and the Christian Democrats share seven minister portfolios. On June 22, the Parliament confirmed Katainen's election as the Prime Minister and President Tarja Halonen inaugurated the government. Two Left Alliance MPs voted against Katainen, for which they were formally reprimanded by the Left Alliance's parliamentary group (and later expelled from the group). On 25 March 2014, the rest of Left Alliance left the cabinet over dispute on a package of spending cuts and tax rises.

In June 2014 Katainen stepped down as party chairman and Prime Minister of Finland for a new position in the European Union. Katainen was replaced by Alexander Stubb as chairman of the National Coalition Party and thus chosen to be the next Prime Minister. Katainen's cabinet was succeeded by the cabinet of Alexander Stubb on 24 June 2014.

Ministers 
The NCP had six ministers in the Cabinet as did the SDP. The Left Alliance, the Green League and the SPP had two ministers each and the Christian Democrats had one. The NCP, SDP, Left Alliance, RKP and Christian Democrats announced their propositions for ministerial portfolios during the weekend of June 17—19 and the Green League announced its ministers on June 20.

|}

Prior to being appointed minister, Hautala, Haglund and Koskinen were not MPs. Hautala and Haglund were MEPs, while Koskinen was a board member of the European Bank for Reconstruction and Development.

Resignation 
Minister for International Development Heidi Hautala resigned the government in October 2013. This was linked to Greenpeace demonstrations against petroleum exploration in the Arctic by the Finnish state-owned firm Arctia and Gazprom Prirazlomnoye field in September 2013.

On 25 March 2014, the Left Alliance left the cabinet over a dispute regarding spending cuts and tax increases. Their ministerial portfolios were redistributed among the biggest parties, but no new ministers were appointed. Minister of Public Administration and Local Government Henna Virkkunen was given the duties of the Minister of Transport, while Minister of Housing and Communications Pia Viitanen became in charge of Culture and Sport.

Government platform
On June 17, the new government announced its platform for the years 2011—2015. Upon its announcement, Helsingin Sanomat highlighted its main points as follows:

Economy

Budget cuts and tax increases
the state assets will increase by €2.5 billion, one half comes from increase in taxation and the other from budget cuts
the main items of expenditure subject to budget cuts are equalization payments, military spending and development aid
budget cuts:
equalization payments from the state to municipalities: –€ 600 million
military spending: –€ 200 million
level of development aid will be frozen in 2013 and 2014
industrial subsidies: –€ 100 million
compensations for costs of medications included in the medical insurance: –€ 100 million
increases in taxation:
Capital gain tax (e.g. on sales profits, rent income, dividends) will go up to 30 %; the tax will be 32 % on the part exceeding € 50,000 per year (as opposed to the previous flat tax on all capital income)
gasoline tax will increase by 10 %
taxes on car ownership, alcohol, tobacco, sweets and soft drinks will increase
tax-deductibility on interest payments of mortgages will decrease gradually from 100 % down to 75 % by the end of the parliamentary term
tax-deductibility on purchased household services (e.g. cleaning) will be reduced to € 2,000 per year
a new tax of 9 % will be imposed on subscriptions to newspapers and journals (as opposed to their previous tax-freedom)

Social benefits
Basic Allowance (an optional form of Unemployment Allowance, the other being Earnings-Related Allowance) and the Labour Market Subsidy will increase by €100 per month
General Housing Allowance: the rent limit, rendering an allowance-seeker ineligible, will increase
Basic part of the Subsistence Benefit will increase by 6%
"special support" will be allocated for single parents
Study Grant will follow the Finnish cost-of-living index since the autumn of 2014

Municipality reform
the new government will implement "large-scale, structural reforms" on municipalities, by forming municipalities accordingly to "the sphere where people come to work to the relevant municipality" and the "vitality" of the municipality; the government will "specify the criteria of the reform" by late 2011

Work careers
while regarding "the extension of work careers inevitable for maintaining a sustainable worker—pensioner ratio and balancing state finances", the new government will "prepare work pension policies in cooperation with the key labour market organizations"
"special concerns" regard:
prevention of work incapacity
development of professional skills

European Union
Finland will "strive for participation in key projects of the EU" and "criticism of the EU by the citizens will be taken seriously".

Energy
the new government "is committed not to grant permissions for new nuclear plants, therefore dismissing Fortum's petition to build one"

Immigration
the government "takes a positive stance on immigration", holding that "immigrants are a permanent and welcome part of the Finnish society"
the government considers the assimilation of immigrants and prevention of discrimination "central" during this tenure
the government strives for an immigration policy that "supports the build-up of a tolerant, safe and pluralistic Finland and strengthens Finland's international competitiveness"

Finnish Broadcasting Company
the funding of the Finnish Broadcasting Company (Yleisradio, YLE) "will be agreed upon during 2011"
the government will "reform the funding" as agreed upon by the parliamentary groups in March 2010

Abortion
the government "strives for a decrease in abortion rates"
the new government will implement a "study on whether the week limit (20) for induced abortion should be altered"; this may "mean that the government considers making abortion laws stricter"
the government wants "to secure the counseling of and support for women seeking for abortion"

Geriatric care
to secure a standard level for geriatric care, a law on geriatric care will be introduced

Income gap 
The gap between the top earners and those worst-off grew during the Katainen Cabinet. The government made many decisions that favored the richest citizens such as the removal of business angel investment taxation. Many tax allowances favored the rich, for example, the household renovation reduction and private retirement funds.

Citizens' initiatives 
During Jyrki Katainen's cabinet, the Parliament of Finland received its first citizens' initiatives. The first citizens' initiative aimed to ban fur farming, but it was rejected on 19 June 2013 by a majority vote in the parliament. Five more initiatives followed concerning themes such as same-sex marriage, changes to piracy laws and the abolishment of mandatory Swedish.

See also
 Stubb Cabinet

References

Katainen
2011 establishments in Finland
2014 disestablishments in Finland
Cabinets established in 2011
Cabinets disestablished in 2014